Mark Paxton (12 May 1875 – 17 August 1948) was a South African sports shooter. He competed in five events at the 1920 Summer Olympics.

References

External links
 

1875 births
1948 deaths
South African male sport shooters
Olympic shooters of South Africa
Shooters at the 1920 Summer Olympics
People from Raymond Mhlaba Local Municipality
Cape Colony people
20th-century South African people